Winter Memories (foaled April 24, 2008 in Kentucky) is an American Thoroughbred racehorse.
As a two-year-old, she won the Miss Grillo Stakes and finished second in the Breeders' Cup Juvenile Fillies Turf. Next year, she returned with the win in the Appalachian Stakes, the Sands Point Stakes, the Lake George Stakes, and the Garden City Stakes. As a four-year-old, she won the Beaugay Stakes and the Diana Stakes. She is now retired and living at Darby Dan Farm.

Owned and breed by Phillips Racing Partnership, she is trained by James J. Toner. Winter Memories has been ridden by Jose Lezcano until she lost in the Lake Placid Stakes when he was replaced with Javier Castellano.

Winter Memories was sired by El Prado, who also sired Paddy O'Prado. She is out of Silver Hawk mare Memories Of Silver.

Racing career

2010 season
On September 3, 2010, Winter Memories won her first start and defeated nine other opponents. She broke her maiden in a Maiden Special Weight going 1 1/16 miles at Saratoga. She was ridden by Jose Lezcano, carried 119 lbs and won by 1 1/2 lengths.

On October 3, 2010, Winter Memories won the 1 1/16 miles Miss Grillo Stakes by 5 lengths at Belmont Park.

On November 5, 2010, Winter Memories finished 2nd in Breeders' Cup Juvenile Fillies Turf as a favorite to More Than Real.

2011 season
On April 21, 2011, Winter Memories won the 1 1/16 miles Grade 3 Appalachian Stakes at Keeneland. She was ridden by Jose Lezcano and won by a neck carrying 123 lbs.

On May 30, 2011, Winter Memories traveled back to Belmont Park where she won the Sands Point Stakes.

Winter Memories went on to win the Grade 2 Lake George Stakes on the July 27, 2011. She broke slow and was last in the six horse field. She had been stopped, but than she went to the outside and won by 4 1/2 lengths.

Winter Memories won her first grade 1 in the Garden City Stakes at Belmont Park. Like her other races, she made a late charge, but she had to overcome major traffic issues to win in a time of 1:51.06. Her late charge was so strong that racetrack announcer Tom Durkin called her a "grey bullet".

2012 season
Winter Memories began her four-year-old campaign with a win in the Beaugay Stakes at Belmont Park in May but then disappointed in the Just A Game Stakes behind Tapitsfly. On July 28, 2012 Winter Memories took her second grade I in the Diana Stakes accelerating at the final bend for a length and half victory. The win saw her emulate her dam Memories of Silver, who won the race in 1998. After the race, her owner John Phillips described her as "a very, very good horse".During the home stretch of the Diana Stakes, however, Winter Memories jolted to the right and appeared to be injured. This spurred on extensive veterinary examinations in the days after the race. It was discovered that Winter Memories had been suffering form a degenerative bone disease for quite some time. On August 9, 2012, owner Phillips Racing Partnership and trainer James J. Toner announced her retirement from racing.

Broodmare career
Winter Memories was bred to top stallion Street Cry in 2013, successfully foaling a chestnut colt by him the following year. As of 2017, the colt, named Make Memories, has not yet raced. She Foaled A filly Winter Sunset by Tapit on January 26, 2016. She won her maiden just like her mother on November 29, 2018. She foaled a colt by Tapit on January 17, 2017 at Darby Dan Farm. The colt will likely be gray, just like his parents.

Career statistics

Pedigree

References

2008 racehorse births
Racehorses bred in Kentucky
Racehorses trained in the United States
Thoroughbred family 4-r